Foz Calanda is a village in the province of Teruel, Aragon, Spain. According to the 2004 census (INE), the municipality has a population of 277 inhabitants.

References

External links
  Informacion and photographs of  Foz de Calanda 
  (Pueblos de España)
  (Pueblos de Teruel)

Municipalities in the Province of Teruel